Phulpur is a  town and municipality in Mymensingh District in the division of Mymensingh, Bangladesh. It is the administrative headquarters and urban centre of Phulpur Upazila.

References

Mymensingh District
Populated places in Mymensingh Division